Stephanie Ariel Williams (born 1987) holds the title of Miss District of Columbia 2010, and competed in the Miss America 2011 Pageant on January 15, 2011, in Las Vegas, Nevada. She is a graduate of Wagner College, with a B.S. in Arts Administration, and is a graduate of the George Washington University School of Medicine and Health Sciences, she went on to UCLA Mattel Children's hospital for her general pediatrics residency, and will be a fellow in neonatology at The Children's Hospital of Los Angeles.,  She was also 1st runner-up in the Miss District of Columbia 2009 pageant. She grew up in Atlantic City, New Jersey, which was home to the Miss America pageant until 2004.

References

External links
 

Living people
Miss America 2011 delegates
People from Atlantic City, New Jersey
People from Washington, D.C.
Wagner College alumni
George Washington University School of Medicine & Health Sciences alumni
1987 births
Holy Spirit High School (New Jersey) alumni
American beauty pageant contestants